Events in the year 2008 in the European Union.

2008 was designated as:
 European Year of Intercultural Dialogue

Incumbents
Commission President: José Manuel Barroso, People's Party
Council Presidency: Slovenia (January – June) France (July - December)
Parliament President: Hans-Gert Pöttering, People's Party
High Representative: Javier Solana, Socialists

Events
 1 January - Cyprus and Malta join the eurozone.
 1 January - Akrotiri and Dhekelia adopt the euro.
 1 January - Slovenia starts the presidency of European Union as the first of new member states.
 29 March - Czech Republic, Estonia, Hungary, Latvia, Lithuania, Malta, Poland, Slovakia and Slovenia implement the Schengen Agreement for airports.
 1 July - France takes over the Presidency from Slovenia.
12 December - Switzerland joins the Schengen area.

References

External links
 Video: What has Europe done for you in 2008?

 
Years of the 21st century in the European Union
2000s in the European Union